Nizhneye Zapolye is a rural locality (a village) in Krasnovishersky District, Perm Krai, Russia. The population was 6 as of 2010. There are 2 streets.

Geography 
Nizhneye Zapolye is located 56 km southeast of Krasnovishersk (the district's administrative centre) by road. Arefina is the nearest rural locality.

References 

Rural localities in Krasnovishersky District